Agelas conifera, also known as the brown tube sponge, is a species of sponge. Its color is brown, tan, or greyish brown with a lighter interior. It is common in the Caribbean and Bahamas, and occasional in Florida. Agelas conifera contains bromopyrrole alkaloids, notably sceptrin and oroidin, and levels of these feeding-deterrents increase upon predation.

Related species
Agelas clathrodes

References

Agelasida